is a Japanese professional golfer who plays on the Japan Golf Tour.

Akiyoshi won twice on the 2018 Japan Golf Tour, the Gateway to The Open Mizuno Open and the Dunlop Srixon Fukushima Open. His win in the Mizuno Open gave an entry to the 2018 Open Championship. He also qualified for the 2018 U.S. Open through sectional qualifying in Japan. He missed the cut in both his major starts.

Akiyoshi also has three wins on the Japan Challenge Tour.

Professional wins (6)

Japan Golf Tour wins (2)

Japan Challenge Tour wins (3)

Other wins (1)
2020 Kyusyu Open

Results in major championships

CUT = missed the halfway cut

References

External links

Japanese male golfers
Japan Golf Tour golfers
1990 births
Living people